Nouakchott-Nord is a region in Mauritania. It comprises the three northwestern departments of Mauritania's capital city Nouakchott: Dar-Naim, Teyarett and Toujouonine. The capital is at Dar-Naim and Nouakchott International Airport was located within its borders.

Nouakchott-Nord was created on 25 November 2014 when the region of Nouakchott was split into three new regions. Its wāli or governor is Mohamed Lemine Ould Mohamed Teyib Ould Adi.

References

Nouakchott
Regions of Mauritania
States and territories established in 2014
2014 establishments in Mauritania